Agrotis endogaea is a moth of the family Noctuidae. It is found in Greece, Corsica, Sardinia, Tunisia and the Canary Islands. It was recently recorded from Sicily.

Larvae have been recorded on Genista and Melandrium species.

Subspecies
Agrotis endogaea endogaea  Dumont, 1903 (Corsica, Sardinia, Sicily)
Agrotis endogaea graeca Fibiger, 1997 (Greece (Serrai))
Agrotis endogaea punica Pinker, 1980 (Tunisia, Canary Islands)

References

External links

Contribution to the Knowledge of Noctuoidea In Sicily (Lepidoptera Nolidae, Erebidae, Noctuidae)
Lepiforum.de

Agrotis
Moths of Europe
Moths of Africa
Moths described in 1837
Taxa named by Jean Baptiste Boisduval